Symmetric Phase Recording is a tape recording (Computer storage media) technology developed by Quantum Corporation packs data across a tape's recording surface by writing adjacent tracks in a herringbone pattern:
 track 0 = \\\\\, track 1 = /////, track 2 = \\\\\, track 3 = /////, etc. 
This eliminates crosstrack interference and guard bands so that more tracks of data can be 
stored on a tape.

References

Further reading

See also 
Azimuth recording,  Slant Azimuth recording
Digital Equipment Corporation
Digital Linear Tape
Linear Tape-Open
Digital Tape Format
Helical scan
Magnetic tape
Magnetic tape data storage
Storage Technology Corporation

Storage media